The Kreider-Reisner XC-31 or Fairchild XC-31 was an American single-engined monoplane transport aircraft of the 1930s designed and built by Kreider-Reisner. It was one of the last fabric-covered aircraft tested by the U.S. Army Air Corps. Designed as an alternative to the emerging twin-engined transports of the time such as the Douglas DC-2, it was evaluated by the Air Corps at Wright Field, Ohio, under the test designation XC-941, but rejected in favor of all-metal twin-engined designs.

The XC-31 was built with an aluminum alloy framework covered by fabric, and featured strut-braced wing and fully retractable landing gear, with the main gear units mounted on small wing-like stubs and retracting inwards. An additional novel feature was the provision of main cargo doors that were parallel with the ground to facilitate loading.

Following evaluation by the USAAC, the XC-31 was transferred to NACA, which used it for icing studies at its Langley Research Center.

Specifications

See also

References

C-031
1930s United States military transport aircraft
Single-engined tractor aircraft
High-wing aircraft
NASA aircraft
Aircraft first flown in 1934
Conventional landing gear